Henry Joseph Crocker II (July 2, 1893 – May 23, 1958) was an American journalist and occasional film actor.

Life and career 
Although Crocker was for most of his career a Los Angeles Examiner newsman, he also appeared as Rex in Charlie Chaplin's The Circus in 1928. He was Chaplin's personal assistant until he was fired during the making of Chaplin's City Lights in 1930. Crocker later reconciled with Chaplin and maintained a friendship until the comedian left America in 1952.

Overall, Crocker appeared in 20 films between 1925 and 1952, mostly in small roles or cameo appearances. His other films besides The Circus include The Big Parade (1925), Tillie the Toiler (1927), Sally in Our Alley (1927), A Warm Corner (1930), The Great John L. (1945), A Song for Miss Julie (1945) and Limelight (1952).

His grand uncle was Charles Crocker (1822–1888) who had been a builder of the Central Pacific Railroad and his distant cousins were was the philanthropist William Henry Crocker, president of Crocker National Bank, mystic, princess and writer Aimee Crocker and Templeton Crocker past president of the California Historical Society who funded and headed expeditions with the California Academy of Sciences and other academic institutions aboard his personal yacht. Crocker married Elizabeth Jenns in late 1936. Crocker was also a close friend of Cole Porter. He died on May 23, 1958, after being in ill health for three years.

Filmography

References

External links

Harry Crocker at Virtual History
Still from The Circus (1928) at gettyimages.com

1893 births
American male film actors
1958 deaths
20th-century American male actors
Crocker family